The  1985–86 New Jersey Devils season was the 12th season for the National Hockey League franchise that was established on June 11, 1974, and fourth season since the franchise relocated from Colorado prior to the 1982–83 NHL season. Kirk Muller making the All-Star Game was the highlight of the season for the Devils, as they finished in last place in their division and conference, good for the third-worst record in the league. This was the franchise's eighth consecutive season out of the playoffs.

Regular season

Final standings

Schedule and results

Player statistics

Regular season
Scoring

Goaltending

Note: GP = Games played; G = Goals; A = Assists; Pts = Points; +/- = Plus/minus; PIM = Penalty minutes; PPG=Power-play goals; SHG=Short-handed goals; GWG=Game-winning goals
      MIN=Minutes played; W = Wins; L = Losses; T = Ties; GA = Goals against; GAA = Goals against average; SO = Shutouts; SA=Shots against; SV=Shots saved; SV% = Save percentage;

Awards and records

Transactions

Draft picks
New Jersey's draft picks at the 1985 NHL Entry Draft.

Notes

References

New Jersey Devils seasons
New Jersey Devils
New Jersey Devils
New Jersey Devils
New Jersey Devils
20th century in East Rutherford, New Jersey
Meadowlands Sports Complex